James Arthur Stevens (August 25, 1889 – September 25, 1966), nicknamed "Steve", was an American professional baseball player who played in two games for the Washington Senators during the  season. He was born in Williamsburg, Maryland and died in Baltimore, Maryland at the age of 77.

External links

Major League Baseball pitchers
Baseball players from Maryland
Washington Senators (1901–1960) players
1889 births
1966 deaths